The Ambassador Extraordinary and Plenipotentiary of the Republic of Finland to the United States of America is in charge of Finland's diplomatic mission to the United States.

The Finnish Embassy is located at 3301 Massachusetts Avenue NW  in the Embassy Row neighborhood of Washington, D.C.

List of Ambassadors

See also 
Finland–United States relations
List of diplomatic missions of Finland
United States Ambassador to Finland

References

External links
 Official site

United States 
Finland